Graham Stuart Staines (18 January 1941 – 23 January 1999) was an Australian Christian missionary, who along with his two sons, Philip (aged 10) and Timothy (aged 6), was burnt to death in India by members of a Hindu fundamentalist group named Bajrang Dal. In 2003, Bajrang Dal activist Dara Singh was convicted of leading the murderers and was sentenced to life in prison.

Staines had been working in Odisha since 1965 as part of an evangelical missionary organisation named "Mayurbhanj Leprosy Home" caring for people who had leprosy and looking after the tribal people in the area who lived in abject poverty. However, some Hindu groups alleged that during this time he had lured or forcibly coerced many Hindus into believing in the Christian faith. The Wadhwa Commission found that although some tribals had been baptised at the camps, there was no evidence of forced conversions. Staines's widow Gladys also denies forced conversions ever happened. Gladys continued to live and work in India caring for those who were poor and were affected by leprosy until she returned home to her native country of Australia in 2004. In 2005, she was awarded the fourth highest honor a civilian can receive in India, the Padma Shree, in recognition for her work in Odisha. In 2016, she received the Mother Teresa Memorial International Award for Social Justice.

Early life and early career
Graham Staines was born in the Sunshine Coast suburb of Palmwoods in the Australian state of Queensland. He visited India for the first time in 1965 by joining the Evangelical Missionary Society of Mayurbhanj (EMSM), and work in the remote tribal area of Odisha state, which had a long history of active Christian missionary style work. He took over the management of the Mission at Baripada in 1983 after helping to establish the Mayurbhanj Leprosy Home as a registered society in 1982.

Personal life 
Staines met his wife of 16 years, Gladys, in June 1981, while they worked together taking care of leprosy patients on the mission field. Not too long after that they decided to get married, in 1983; they worked together until his death. Together they had three children: a daughter, Esther, and two sons, Philip and Timothy. During the course of his work Staines had managed to assist in the translation of part of the Holy Christian Bible into the language of the Ho people of India, which included his crosschecking the work with the entire manuscript of the New Testament, though it is largely believed his main focus was on his ministry to the lepers. It was reported that he could speak the Odia language fluently, and was popular among the patients whom he had managed to cure. In addition to this it was also reported that he used to teach people how to make mats and baskets out of rope, sabai grass (Eulaliopsis binata) and tree leaves.

Death and reaction
On 22 January 1999, Staines attended a jungle camp in Manoharpur, which was an annual gathering for Christians in the area to congregate for a conference and discuss their beliefs in a social setting. The camp was on the border between the tribal villages of Mayurbhanj and Keonjhar, which is located within the district of Odisha. He was travelling to the village of Kendujhar with his sons, who were on a break from their schooling in the hill city of Ooty in southern India, when they decided to take a break from the journey towards the jungle camp, and elected to spend the night in Manoharpur, sleeping in the vehicle due to the severe cold at the time. His wife and daughter did not accompany them on the journey, having decided to remain behind in the town and municipality of Baripada.

A mob of about fifty people, armed with axes and other implements, attacked the vehicle while Staines and his sons were fast asleep, and set the station wagon alight, trapping them inside and burning them to death.

Staines and his sons had awakened and apparently tried to escape, but were prevented from doing so by the angry mob of vigilantes.

The murders were widely condemned by religious and civic leaders of the time, along with politicians and journalists. The US-based Human Rights Watch group accused the Indian government of failing to prevent violence against Christians, and for exploiting the sectarian tensions that existed at the time for their own political gain. The then-Prime Minister of India, Atal Behari Vajpayee, a leader of the BJP, condemned the "ghastly attack," and called for swift action in catching the killers. Published reports stated that the church leaders alleged the attacks were carried out at the behest of hard-line Hindu organizations seeking revenge for what they perceived to be forced conversions of the tribal poor into Christianity. Dara Singh, who was convicted of the murders, was treated as a hero by the hard-line Hindus and reportedly protected by some villagers. In an interview with the Hindustan Times, one of the accused killers, Mahendra Hembram, stated that the killers "were provoked by the 'corruption of tribal culture' by the missionaries, who they claimed fed villagers beef, and gave the women brassieres and sanitary towels."

In her affidavit before the Commission on the death of her husband and two sons, Gladys Staines stated:The Lord God is always with me to guide me and to help me try to accomplish the work of Graham, but I sometimes wonder why Graham was killed, and what also made his assassins behave in such a brutal manner on the night of the 22nd/23rd of January 1999. 
... It is far from my mind to punish the persons who were responsible for the death of my husband Graham and my two children. But it is my desire and hope that they would repent and be reformed.

The Least of These: The Graham Staines Story, a film that is based on his killing, was released in 2019. The film is slated for release in Hindi on the ShemarooMe app on the 28th of August, 2020

Supreme Court of India judgement
A trial (sessions) court in Bhubaneswar, the capital of Odisha (then named Orissa), sentenced the convicted ringleader of the mob, Dara Singh, to death by hanging for killing Staines and his two sons. In 2005, the Orissa High Court commuted the sentence to life imprisonment. The Supreme Court upheld the High Court decision on 21 January 2011.

"In the case on hand, though Graham Staines and his two minor sons were burnt to death while they were sleeping inside a station wagon at Manoharpur, the intention was to teach a lesson to Graham Staines about his religious activities, namely, converting poor tribals to Christianity. All these aspects have been correctly appreciated by the High Court and modified the sentence of death into life imprisonment with which we concur." the court declared. The Court stated, "Our concept of secularism is that the State will have no religion. The State shall treat all religions and religious groups equally and with equal respect without in any manner interfering with their individual right of religion, faith and worship."  The Court also said, "It is undisputed that there is no justification for interfering in someone's belief by way of 'use of force', provocation, conversion, incitement or upon a flawed premise that one religion is better than the other". 

Dismissing the Central Bureau of Investigation's plea for sentencing Singh to death, a Bench of Justice P. Sathasivam and Justice B. S. Chauhan endorsed the Orissa High Court's finding that his crime did not fall under the rarest of rare category. In its 76-page judgment, the court came out strongly against the practice of conversion. However, four days later, on 25 January 2011, the Supreme Court of India, in a rare move, expunged its own comments with regards to conversions from its verdict. This was perhaps done due to severe criticism from the media. Leading editors, media groups and civil society members from across the country signed a statement taking strong exception to the Supreme Court's observation that the killing of Graham Staines and his two minor children was intended to teach the Australian missionary a lesson for preaching and practising conversion.

See also
Christian mission
Murder of Lakshmanananda Saraswati

References

External links
 "Who Killed Australian Missionary Graham Staines?", by Arun Shourie
 "Graham Staines murder case: Chronology of events" at rediff.com, 22 September 2003
 "Burnt Alive: The Staines and the God they Loved". A Book by Gospel Literature Service

1941 births
1999 deaths
1999 murders in India
20th-century translators
Anti-Christian sentiment in Asia
Australian evangelicals
Australian expatriates in India
Australia–India relations
Australian people murdered abroad
Australian Protestant missionaries
Australian terrorism victims
Bible translators
Conversion to Christianity
Evangelicalism in India
Hate crimes in India
Hinduism-motivated violence in India
Leprosy nurses and caregivers
Missionary linguists
People from the Sunshine Coast, Queensland
People murdered in Odisha
Protestant missionaries in India
Terrorist incidents in India in the 1990s
Victims of anti-Christian violence
Victims of serial killers